Narodowa Organizacja Wojskowa (National Military Organization, NOW) was one of the Polish resistance movements in World War II. Created in October 1939, it did not merge with the Service for Poland's Victory (SZP)/Union of Armed Struggle (ZWZ); later Home Army (AK). Nevertheless, it recognized the Polish government in exile, which was located in London. The National Military Organization was politically related to the National Party (SN). In 1942/1943  it split into two parts; one merged with the Home Army, while another formed the National Armed Forces (NSZ). After the Warsaw Uprising, most of NOW members formed the National Military Union (NZW).

History 
On October 13, 1939, a few days after the end of the joint German and Soviet Invasion of Poland, a conspirational meeting of leaders of the National Party took place in Warsaw. During the meeting, a military organization called the National Army was created. Later on, it changed the name into Military Organization of the National Party (Organizacja Wojskowa Stronnictwa Narodowego), then it was called National Armed Units (Narodowe Oddzially Wojskowe), to finally be named Narodowa Organizacja Wojskowa (since July 1, 1941).

The NOW was politically, financially and personally overseen by Military Department of the National Party. At the same time, it had a widespread autonomy concerning its structure, intelligence, and training. Its first planned commandant was General Marian Januszajtis-Zegota, but he was arrested by the NKVD in Lwów, on October 27, 1939. Under the circumstances, the NOW was commanded by Colonel Aleksander Demidowicz-Demidecki. In December 1939, Demidecki left occupied Poland, and was replaced by Colonel Boleslaw Kozubowski.

In the late 1940 and 1941, the Gestapo carried out mass arrests of members of the National Party in Lesser Poland, Pomerelia and Warsaw. After this, the party had to re-create its depleted structures, and in September 1941, new leader of the SN, Stefan Sacha, named Colonel Jozef Rokicki new commandant of the NOW. In the spring 1942, several units of the NOW, mainly from Warsaw and Radom, decided to become part of the Home Army, and in May 1942, Stefan Sacha contacted General Stefan Rowecki, discussing with him merger of the two organizations. As a result, on August 23, 1942 an agreement was signed, and in November 1942, the merger was completed. Several NOW members, headed by August Michalowski,  disagreed with it. The organization split into two parts - one was united with the Home Army, while another continued independent activities. The new NOW was headed by Colonel Ignacy Oziewicz, and was divided into five districts: Radom, Kielce, Częstochowa, Podlasie, Lublin and Łódź. In 1942, the new NOW merged with Military Organization Lizard Union, creating the National Armed Forces (Narodowe Sily Zbrojne, NSZ).

In 1942, before the split, the NOW had some 80,000 members, mostly in Greater Poland, Lesser Poland and Mazovia. It had its own guerilla units, under such leaders, as Franciszek Przysiezniak, Jozef Czuchra, Leon Janio and Jozef Zadzierski. The organization, however, concentrated its efforts on intelligence, and capturing German agents and collaborators. Weapons and ammunition were collected for the future uprising, a system of communication was created, underground press was distributed. There were several sabotage actions, and in order to rescue Jews, the NOW cooperated with other organizations. Some 1500 NOW soldiers fought in the Warsaw Uprising.

Structure 
 Commandant in Chief of the NOW
 Headquarters of the NOW
 First Department (Organizational),
 Second Department (Intelligence),
 Third Department (Training and Operations),
 Fourth Department (Supply),
 Fifth Department (Communications),
 Central Propaganda Office,
 Sanitary Services,
 Women's National Military Organization (since 1942).

Districts 
Until mid-1941, the NOW was divided into 14 districts:
 Warsaw - City,
 Warsaw - Land,
 Radom,
 Kielce,
 Lublin,
 Rzeszow (also called Central Industrial Area),
 Białystok,
 Kraków,
 Częstochowa,
 Lwów (since June 1943),
 Podlasie,
 Łódź,
 Poznań
 Pomorze and Kujawy.

Publications 
 Walka (Struggle). Main publication of the National Party, with circulation of 20,000,
 Wielka Polska,
 Rzeczpospolita Polska 
 Mloda Polska,
 Polak,
 Zolnierz Wielkiej Polski,
 Sprawa Narodu,
 Mysl Narodowa.

World War II resistance movements
Military units and formations of Poland in World War II
Polish underground organisations during World War II
National Democracy
Polish resistance during World War II